The siege of Seville (July 1247 – November 1248) was a 16-month successful investment during the Reconquista of Seville by forces of Ferdinand III of Castile. Although perhaps eclipsed in geopolitical importance by the rapid capture of Córdoba in 1236, which sent a shockwave through the Muslim world, the siege of Seville was nonetheless the most complex military operation undertaken by Fernando III. It is also the last major operation of the Early Reconquista. The operation also marked the appearance of indigenous naval forces of Castile-León of military significance. In effect, Ramón de Bonifaz was the first admiral of Castile, although he never held an official title of that kind.

In 1246, after the conquest of Jaén, Seville and Granada were the only major cities in the Iberian Peninsula that had not acquiesced to Christian suzerainty. Of the two, Granada would remain semi-independent until 1492.

During the summer of 1247, Castilian armies isolated the city to the north and east. This paved the way for the siege, which started when Ramón de Bonifaz sailed with thirteen galleys, accompanied by some smaller ships, up the Guadalquivir and scattered some forty smaller vessels trying to oppose him. On 3 May the Castilian fleet broke the pontoon bridge linking Seville and Triana.

St Albertus Magnus wrote that the Moorish defenders used artillery which was loaded with rocks in the siege, but this is not certain that is describing the type of firearms.

Due to a famine, the city capitulated on 23 November 1248. The terms specified that the Castillian troops would be allowed to enter the alcázar no later than a month later. Ferdinand made his triumphant entry into the city on 22 December 1248. Muslim chronicles record that some 300,000 inhabitants left the city. This number is considered exaggerated by O'Callaghan.

References 
 

Seville
History of Seville
Seville
Seville
13th century in Al-Andalus
1247 in Europe
1248 in Europe
Seville
13th century in Castile
Seville